Emaar India Limited is a real estate developer principally engaged in promotion, construction, development and sale of integrated townships, residential and commercial multi storied buildings, houses, flats, shopping malls, hotels, and other developments. The company develops residential and commercial projects in different parts of India, including Gurugram, Delhi/NCR, Mohali, Lucknow, Indore and other Indian cities.

Emaar started its operations in 2005 and has been known for bringing in the largest foreign direct investment in the construction-development sector of India.  The Company is promoted by Emaar Properties PJSC, Dubai (“Emaar”). Being a subsidiary of Emaar, the company is also controlled and managed by Emaar in India.

Emaar is a public company established in 1997 under the laws of Dubai, UAE and is listed on the Dubai Financial Market. Its market capitalization is over  billion and assets are valued at over  billion. It has developed master-planned communities internationally, and is present in several key global markets like the Middle East, Africa, Asia, Europe, the United States and Canada.

Emaar's flagship development Downtown Dubai hosts properties like the Burj Khalifa, The Dubai Mall and The Dubai Fountain. It has also developed residential projects like Arabian Ranches, Emirates Living, and Dubai Marina.

History
On April 11, 2016, Emaar Properties terminated its joint venture with MGF Developments. Following this, Emaar MGF Land Ltd filed the demerger scheme in Delhi High Court on May 16, 2016.

In August 2017, Emaar India stated that it has appointed of Snapdeal’s Chief Strategy & Investment Officer Jason Kothari and Sudip Mullick of the law firm Khaitan & Co to the board of directors.

Emaar India communicated to its customers about initiating the process of demerger of the Company pursuant to a Scheme of Arrangement under Section 391-394 of the Companies Act, 1956 and filing such Scheme with Delhi High Court. It also shared target completion schedules for all projects with achievement of specific milestones and uploaded the same on its website to reassure customers that ongoing projects would be completed.

Emaar revamped its project management team to speed up execution and delivery of over 50 projects that were stuck due to the impending demerger between the two parent companies. The developer hired over 100 additional employees in the Project Management space. The developer increased its workforce to 10,000 labourers at the time of initiating the demerger process. By September 2017, the labour headcount was more than 15,000 labourers.

Projects
 Emaar Digi Homes
 Emaar Palm Heights
 Emaar Business District 65
 Emaar Business District 114
 Emaar Business District 89
 Emaar Colonnade
 Emaar Emerald Plaza
 Emaar Palm Square
 Emaar Continental City
 Mohali Hills
 Central Plaza
 The Views
 Emaar Emerald Hills

Awards

2017 
Emaar India has won 4 awards at the DNA Real Estate & Infrastructure Awards 2017, in Mumbai - 'Developer of the Year - Residential', 'Employer of the Year Real Estate', 'Residential Property of the Year' for its Emerald Hills project, and 'CSR Initiative of the Year by a Real Estate Firm' for its creche program ‘Guardians of Hope’.

Emaar India has won 2 awards at the 9th Realty Plus Conclave and Excellence Awards 2017 - 'Developer of the Year' in the Residential category, and 'Green Project of the Year for Digital Greens'.

2016 
Emaar India has won the ‘Residential Project of the Year’ award for The Palm Drive (Gurgaon) at the DNA Real Estate & Infrastructure Awards 2016.
Emaar India has won 2 awards at the 8th Realty Plus Conclave and Excellence Awards 2016 - 'Luxury Project of the Year - The Palm Drive’ and ‘Commercial Property of the Year - The Palm Springs Plaza’.
Emaar India has won The Palm Drive, Gurugram wins ‘Residential Project of the Year’ at DNA Real Estate Awards 2016.

References

Real estate companies established in 2005
Real estate companies of India
Indian subsidiaries of foreign companies